Toshia Mori (としあ もり) was a Japanese actress who had a brief career in American films during the late 1920s and 1930s. Born as Toshiye Ichioka (としえ いちおか) in Kyoto, Mori moved to the United States when she was 10.

Early life and career

Mori began her film career in silent films in the late 1920s. In Mr. Wu (1927) she was credited as Toshia Ichioka. In Streets of Shanghai (1927), she was credited as Toshiye Ichioka. In The Man Without a Face, she was also credited as Toshiye Ichioka, her birth name. (The film is presumed lost.) Finally, she entered the sound era as Toshia Mori.

Mori played Miss Ling in The Hatchet Man (1932). In the same year, she played another Chinese character, "Butterfly", in Roar of the Dragon, an action-melodrama produced by David O. Selznick. The storyline consisted of a group of Occidentals turning to an alcoholic riverboat captain Chauncey Carson (Richard Dix) for help when they are trapped at a hotel in a Mandarin town under siege.

In 1932, Toshia became the only Asian and non-Caucasian actress to be selected as a WAMPAS Baby Star, an annual list of young and promising film actresses. WAMPAS may have led to the most significant film role of her career, for shortly afterward, she appeared in Frank Capra's film The Bitter Tea of General Yen (1933), a role that was originally scheduled for Anna May Wong. The story involved the erotically charged relationship between a missionary (Barbara Stanwyck) and a Chinese warlord (Nils Asther). The script also featured a vital character, Mah-Li, a concubine whose scheming throws a spanner into the plots of those around her. Capra and Columbia Pictures, both extremely happy with Mori's work, awarded her third billing. Time's favorable review read: "Stanwyck is satisfactory but the most noteworthy female member of the cast is Toshia Mori, a sloe-eyed Japanese girl…"

Mori returned to minor characters in her subsequent films.  In The Painted Veil (1934), starring Greta Garbo, she materializes as the centerpiece of "The Moon Festival" sequence. In Chinatown Squad (1935) she played "Wanda". She appeared in Charlie Chan at the Circus in 1936, and in Charlie Chan on Broadway (1937), Lee (Keye Luke) becomes involved with Ling Tse (Toshia Mori), an employee of the Hottentot Club.

Post-cinema life
In 1930, Mori married Allen Jung, a Chinese-American from San Francisco. After her film career ended, Mori worked as a researcher for Robert Ripley on his short films, Ripley's Believe It or Not. She died in The Bronx, New York, aged 83. Her ashes were scattered at sea.

Filmography

Further reading
The Wampas Baby Stars: A Biographical Dictionary, 1922–1934 includes biographies of every actress selected, including lists of films in which she appeared.

References

External links
 
 The WAMPAS Baby Stars
 
 The Bitter Tea of General Yen A page on the 1933 Toshia Mori movie
 Toshia Mori
 . Young stars of 1933 featured in this newsreel with Johnny Mack Brown and Willy Pogany

1912 births
1995 deaths
American film actresses
American silent film actresses
Japanese emigrants to the United States
Actresses from Kyoto
Burials at Woodlawn Cemetery (Bronx, New York)
American actresses of Japanese descent
American film actors of Asian descent
20th-century American actresses
WAMPAS Baby Stars